Lazăr Comănescu (born 6 June 1949 in Horezu, Vâlcea County) is a Romanian diplomat. He was the foreign minister of Romania from 15 April 2008 until 22 December 2008. He was named Romania's ambassador to Germany in 2009. Since 17 November 2015 he has assumed the functions of Minister of Foreign Affairs of Romania.

See also
List of foreign ministers in 2017

Notes

External links

 MAE.ro
 Biography from Ministry of Foreign Affairs of Romania

|-

1949 births
Ambassadors of Romania to Germany
Living people
Members of the Romanian Orthodox Church
People from Horezu
Romanian Ministers of Foreign Affairs